Mfezi is a Zulu word meaning "snake".
In particular, it applies to:
The Mfezi, an armoured ambulance used by the South African Military Health Service;
The Mozambique spitting cobra, Naja mossambica.